Nalkiashar may refer to:
 Bala Mahalleh-ye Nalkiashar
 Pain Mahalleh-ye Nalkiashar